Tallahassee Commercial Airport  is a closed, privately owned airport located on US 27, 8 miles (13 km) northwest of the central business district (CBD) of Tallahassee, the county seat of Leon County, Florida, United States. As of January 13, 2011, the FAA reported the airport as "closed indefinitely" due to pending construction.

Facilities 

 Runway 16/34: 3,249 x 50 ft. (990 x 15 m), surface: asphalt
 The runway is described as being in poor condition, with surface cracking.
 The first 50 feet of Runway 16 are closed indefinitely.

References 

Airport Master Record (FAA Form 5010)

External links 

Defunct airports in Florida
Airports in Florida
Transportation in Tallahassee, Florida
Transportation buildings and structures in Leon County, Florida
Privately owned airports